The 2015 Patriot League softball tournament was held at Leadership Park on the campus of Lehigh University in Bethlehem, Pennsylvania from May 7 through May 9, 2015. It was won by the Lehigh Mountain Hawks, who advanced to the 2015 NCAA Division I softball tournament.

Tournament

All times listed are Eastern Daylight Time.

References

Tournament, 2015
Patriot League Tournament